Danai-Eleni Sidira (born 14 January 1991) is a Greek footballer who plays as a midfielder for A Division club Ergotelis and the Greece women's national team.

Honours 
Ergotelis
 B Division (1): 2008

Apollon Ladies
 First Division (5): 2014, 2015, 2016, 2017, 2019
 Cypriot Cup (5): 2014, 2015, 2016, 2017, 2018
 Cypriot Super Cup (4): 2013, 2014, 2015, 2017

Individual
 PASP Best 11 Women: 2018/19
 PSAT Fair Play Award: 2021

References

External links 
 Profile at uefa.com
 

1991 births
Living people
Women's association football midfielders
Greek women's footballers
Greece women's international footballers
Expatriate women's footballers in Cyprus
Apollon Ladies F.C. players
Greek expatriate women's footballers
Greek expatriate sportspeople in Cyprus